Fernando de Noronha is an island group off the coast of Brazil.

Fernando de Noronha may also refer to:
 Fernão de Loronha (fl. 1502), Lisbon merchant who gave his name to island group
 Fernando de Noronha, 2nd Count of Vila Real (d.1445), governor of Ceuta
 Fernando de Noronha Marine National Park, a protected area on the island
 Fernando de Noronha Environmental Protection Area, a controlled tourist area on the island